Iknow Chabi (born 18 June 1984) is a Zimbabwean cricket umpire. He has stood in matches in the 2016–17 Logan Cup and the 2016–17 Pro50 Championship tournaments.

On 4 July 2018, he stood in his first Twenty20 International (T20I) match, between Zimbabwe and Pakistan, during the 2018 Zimbabwe Tri-Nation Series. On 12 April 2019, he stood in his first One Day International (ODI) match, between Zimbabwe and the United Arab Emirates. In January 2020, he was named as one of the sixteen umpires for the 2020 Under-19 Cricket World Cup tournament in South Africa.

See also
 List of One Day International cricket umpires
 List of Twenty20 International cricket umpires

References

External links
 

1984 births
Living people
Zimbabwean cricket umpires
Zimbabwean One Day International cricket umpires
Zimbabwean Twenty20 International cricket umpires
Sportspeople from Harare